The following is a list of named topologies or topological spaces, many of which are counterexamples in topology and related branches of mathematics. This is not a list of properties that a topology or topological space might possess; for that, see List of general topology topics and Topological property.

Discrete and indiscrete

 Discrete topology − All subsets are open.
 Indiscrete topology, chaotic topology, or Trivial topology − Only the empty set and its complement are open.

Cardinality and ordinals

 Cocountable topology
 Cofinite topology
 Double-pointed cofinite topology
 Ordinal number topology
 Pseudo-arc
 Ran space
 Tychonoff plank

Finite spaces

 Discrete two-point space − The simplest example of a totally disconnected discrete space.
 Either–or topology
 Finite topological space
 Pseudocircle − A finite topological space on 4 elements that fails to satisfy any separation axiom besides T0. However, from the viewpoint of algebraic topology, it has the remarkable property that it is indistinguishable from the circle 
 Sierpiński space, also called the connected two-point set − A 2-point set  with the particular point topology

Integers

 Arens–Fort space − A Hausdorff, regular, normal space that is not first-countable or compact. It has an element (i.e. ) for which there is no sequence in  that converges to  but there is a sequence  in  such that  is a cluster point of 
 Arithmetic progression topologies
 The Baire space −  with the product topology, where  denotes the natural numbers endowed with the discrete topology. It is the space of all sequences of natural numbers.
 Divisor topology
 Partition topology
 Deleted integer topology
 Odd–even topology

Fractals and Cantor set

 Apollonian gasket
 Cantor set − A subset of the closed interval  with remarkable properties.
 Cantor dust
 Cantor space
 Koch snowflake
 Menger sponge
 Mosely snowflake
 Sierpiński carpet
 Sierpiński triangle
 Smith–Volterra–Cantor set, also called the  − A closed nowhere dense (and thus meagre) subset of the unit interval  that has positive Lebesgue measure and is not a Jordan measurable set. The complement of the fat Cantor set in Jordan measure is a bounded open set that is not Jordan measurable.

Orders

 Alexandrov topology
 Lexicographic order topology on the unit square
 Order topology
 Lawson topology
 Poset topology
 Upper topology
 Scott topology
 Scott continuity
 Priestley space
 Roy's lattice space
It is compact Hausdorff, hereditarily Lindelöf, and hereditarily separable but not metrizable. Its metrizable subspaces are all countable.
 Specialization (pre)order

Manifolds and complexes

 Branching line − A non-Hausdorff manifold.
 Double origin topology
 E8 manifold − A topological manifold that does not admit a smooth structure.
 Euclidean topology − The natural topology on Euclidean space  induced by the Euclidean metric, which is itself induced by the Euclidean norm. 
 Real line − 
 Unit interval − 
 Extended real number line
 Fake 4-ball − A compact contractible topological 4-manifold.
 House with two rooms − A contractible, 2-dimensional  simplicial complex that is not collapsible.
 Klein bottle
 Lens space
 Line with two origins, also called the  − It is a non-Hausdorff manifold. It is locally homeomorphic to Euclidean space and thus locally metrizable (but not metrizable) and locally Hausdorff (but not Hausdorff). It is also a T1 locally regular space but not a semiregular space.
 Prüfer manifold − A Hausdorff 2-dimensional real analytic manifold that is not paracompact.
 Real projective line
 Torus
 3-torus
 Solid torus
 Unknot
 Whitehead manifold − An open 3-manifold that is contractible, but not homeomorphic to

Hyperbolic geometry

 Gieseking manifold − A cusped hyperbolic 3-manifold of finite volume.
 Horosphere
 Horocycle
 Picard horn
 Seifert–Weber space

Paradoxical spaces

 Gabriel's horn − It has infinite surface area but finite volume.

Unique

 Hantzsche–Wendt manifold − A compact, orientable, flat 3-manifold. It is the only closed flat 3-manifold with first Betti number zero.

Related or similar to manifolds

 Dogbone space
 Dunce hat (topology)
 Hawaiian earring
 Long line (topology)
 Rose (topology)

Embeddings or maps between spaces

 Alexander horned sphere − A particular embedding of a sphere into 3-dimensional Euclidean space.
 Antoine's necklace − A topological embedding of the Cantor set in 3-dimensional Euclidean space, whose complement is not simply connected.
 Irrational winding of a torus/Irrational cable on a torus
 Knot (mathematics)
 Linear flow on the torus
 Space-filling curve
 Torus knot
 Wild knot

Counter-examples (general topology)

The following topologies are a known source of counterexamples for point-set topology. 

 Alexandroff plank
 Appert topology − A Hausdorff, perfectly normal (T6), zero-dimensional space that is countable, but neither first countable, locally compact, nor countably compact.
 Arens square
 Bullet-riddled square - The space  where  is the set of bullets. Neither of these sets is Jordan measurable although both are Lebesgue measurable. 
 Cantor tree
 Comb space
 Dieudonné plank
 Double origin topology
 Dunce hat (topology)
 Excluded point topology − A topological space where the open sets are defined in terms of the exclusion of a particular point.
 Fort space
 Half-disk topology
 Hilbert cube −  with the product topology.
 Infinite broom
 Integer broom topology
 K-topology
 Knaster–Kuratowski fan
 Long line (topology)
 Moore plane, also called the  − A first countable, separable, completely regular, Hausdorff, Moore space that is not normal, Lindelöf, metrizable, second countable, nor locally compact. It also an uncountable closed subspace with the discrete topology.
 Nested interval topology
 Overlapping interval topology − Second countable space that is T0 but not T1.
 Particular point topology − Assuming the set is infinite, then contains a non-closed compact subset whose closure is not compact and moreover, it is neither metacompact nor paracompact.
 Rational sequence topology
 Sorgenfrey line, which is  endowed with lower limit topology − It is Hausdorff, perfectly normal, first-countable, separable, paracompact, Lindelöf, Baire, and a Moore space but not metrizable, second-countable, σ-compact, nor locally compact.
 Sorgenfrey plane, which is the product of two copies of the Sorgenfrey line − A Moore space that is neither normal, paracompact, nor second countable.
 Topologist's sine curve
 Tychonoff plank
 Vague topology
 Warsaw circle

Topologies defined in terms of other topologies

Natural topologies

List of natural topologies. 

 Adjunction space
 Corona set
 Disjoint union (topology)
 Extension topology
 Initial topology
 Final topology
 Product topology
 Quotient topology
 Subspace topology
 Weak topology

Compactifications

Compactifications include:

 Alexandroff extension
 Projectively extended real line
 Bohr compactification
 Eells–Kuiper manifold
 Projectively extended real line
 Stone–Čech compactification
 Stone topology
 Wallman compactification

Topologies of uniform convergence

This lists named topologies of uniform convergence.

 Compact-open topology
 Loop space
 Interlocking interval topology
 Modes of convergence (annotated index)
 Operator topologies
 Pointwise convergence
 Weak convergence (Hilbert space)
 Weak* topology
 Polar topology
 Strong dual topology
 Topologies on spaces of linear maps

Other induced topologies

 Box topology
 Compact complement topology
 Extension topology

Functional analysis

 Auxiliary normed spaces
 Finest locally convex topology
 Finest vector topology
 Helly space
 Mackey topology
 Polar topology
 Vague topology

Operator topologies

 Dual topology
 Norm topology
 Operator topologies
 Pointwise convergence
 Weak convergence (Hilbert space)
 Weak* topology
 Polar topology
 Strong dual space
 Strong operator topology
 Topologies on spaces of linear maps
 Ultrastrong topology
 Ultraweak topology/weak-* operator topology
 Weak operator topology

Tensor products

 Inductive tensor product
 Injective tensor product
 Projective tensor product
 Tensor product of Hilbert spaces
 Topological tensor product

Probability 
 Émery topology

Other topologies

 Erdős space − A Hausdorff, totally disconnected, one-dimensional topological space  that is homeomorphic to 
 Half-disk topology
 Hedgehog space
 Partition topology
 Zariski topology

See also

Citations

References

External links

 π-Base: An Interactive Encyclopedia of Topological Spaces

General topology
Mathematics-related lists
Topological spaces